ITKO (Interactive TKO, Inc.) was an enterprise software company based in Plano, Texas. ITKO's LISA product suite (now rebranded CA DevTest) is designed to improve the effectiveness of application development teams, especially those involved in custom applications, SOA, and cloud computing. ITKO became a CA Technologies company in 2011.

History
Company founders John Michelsen and Ruston Vickers were operating a custom software consulting company when they invented the test engine kernel of LISA 1.0 in 1999 to provide high-volume load testing of a Java-based trading network.

Since the first commercial release of LISA 2.0 in 2002, ITKO has increasingly focused on testing the many disparate types of components and technologies that can make up distributed, Internet-based enterprise applications.

Shridhar Mittal became president and CEO in September 2005.

The company's customers include First Data, American Airlines, ANZ, Citigroup, DirecTV, Oracle Corporation, Southern California Edison, and Time Warner Cable.

On June 29, 2011, CA Technologies announced that it would acquire ITKO for $330 million. In August, CA announced that the acquisition had been completed.

Products
The LISA suite includes the following products:

 LISA Service Virtualization (or Virtualize): Pioneered the concept of service virtualization, which involves creating virtual models to simulate the behavior of constrained resources to eliminate dependencies on unavailable or inaccessible resources during the software development and testing phases.
 LISA Test: Provides an automated testing solution for distributed application architectures that leverage SOA, BPM, integration suites, and ESBs. Product teams can use LISA Test to design and execute automated unit, functional, regression, integration, load, and performance tests. They can test multiple layers of the distributed architecture, including Rich Internet Application UIs and heterogeneous middle-tier technologies.
 LISA Validate: Helps organizations to ensure that changes to individual services do not cause unintended consequences for business requirements and policies.
 LISA Pathfinder: Improves the ability of development and testing teams to identify and fix defects in complex, distributed systems.

References

External links
 CA LISA Service Virtualization (former ITKO LISA product)
 ServiceVirtualization.Com community forum
 Old ITKO Home Page
 Virtualization Journal article byline: "Are SOA and Virtualization Related?" March 2, 2008.
 SearchSOA article "SOA Virtualization Gets Real," Rich Seeley, November 28, 2007.

CA Technologies
1999 establishments in Texas
2011 mergers and acquisitions
Companies based in Plano, Texas
Defunct software companies of the United States
Development software companies
Software companies based in Texas
Software companies established in 1999
Software companies disestablished in 2011
Software review
Software testing tools